Jerry-Go-Round is a 1966 Tom and Jerry short produced and directed by Chuck Jones.

Plot
Running from Tom, Jerry loses him in a traveling circus where he finds a female elephant with a golden tack on her foot, crying in pain. Jerry thinks of a plan to remove the tack stuck on the elephant's foot, and Tom watches the elephant crying with an evil smile. Jerry removes the tack from the elephant's foot and at first she is scared. However, when she notices Jerry holding up the tack which he removed off of her foot, she is overjoyed. Jerry wins over the affection of the elephant as she picks him up with her trunk and hugs him in gratitude. Tom on the other hand, manages to make enemies with the elephant by climbing up a ladder and trying to take the mouse from her. The elephant uses her trunk to grab Jerry and places him safely on top of her head. Turning her attention back to Tom, the elephant smacks him underground. She continues hugging the mouse and Tom climbs out of the hole before fainting.

Annoyed, Tom watches the clowns walk by until he sees Jerry in a miniature clown outfit. He spies on both the mouse and elephant as they perform a circus dance, passing a ball back and forth. Tom bursts the ball with a slingshot. Tom walks across the wire and stomps on it repeatedly, bouncing Jerry into his hands. He walks over the wire back to the ramp only to run into the irate elephant. She uses her weight to pull the wire and both of them all the way down to the ground. She suctions the mouse into her trunk and releases the cat, launching him out of the circus tent.

Later, Tom chases Jerry up a tall ladder to a diving board. Jerry dives, and Tom soon follows him. The elephant drinks down the water with her trunk and saves Jerry. Relieved, she kisses him and leaves. Tom crashes through the ground with such force he falls all the way into hell. An irate devil takes him back up to the surface and throws him out using his trident, as if telling him don't come back. He goes back into Hell in peace.

The elephant plays with Jerry. Tom shakes pepper into the elephant's trunk, causing a gigantic sneeze that shoots Jerry miles from the circus. Tom runs backwards with a baseball glove to catch the mouse, but somehow the elephant ends up behind Tom. He runs up the elephant's leg and readies to catch the mouse. However, she has other plans and in anger lowers her trunk down to confront Tom again. Realizing too late he is in trouble, the elephant throws Tom off and catches the glove and then catches Jerry. She hugs the mouse.

Leading the circus parade together, Jerry plays the bugle and the elephant plays a very loud drum. Tom hides in a manhole to set a trap with dynamite that will explode when the elephant stomps on the switch. However, the stomping bounces the dynamite back with Tom as he unwittingly closes the manhole, without him even realizing it. The elephant steps on the switch and Tom explodes. The defeated cat waves a "The End" white flag as the elephant stops temporarily to kick some dust up near the manhole.

Crew
Story: John Dunn
Animation: Dick Thompson, Ben Washam, Ken Harris, Don Towsley & Tom Ray
Layouts: Don Morgan
Backgrounds: Philip DeGuard
Design Consultant & Co-Director: Maurice Noble
Vocal Effects: June Foray & Mel Blanc
In Charge of Production: Les Goldman
Music: Eugene Poddany
Produced by Chuck Jones
Directed by Chuck Jones & Abe Levitow

Reception
Media studies scholar, Jo Johnson, argued that the short had a coded same-sex relationship between Jerry, who was gendered by Jones as female, and a female elephant who wears a pink tutu. He also argued that the episode's ending could be read as a "prophetic depiction of Gay Pride."

References

External links

1966 animated films
1966 films
1966 short films
Circus films
Short films directed by Chuck Jones
Films directed by Maurice Noble
Films directed by Abe Levitow
Films scored by Eugene Poddany
Tom and Jerry short films
1960s American animated films
1966 comedy films
Metro-Goldwyn-Mayer short films
Metro-Goldwyn-Mayer animated short films
Animated films about elephants
Animated films without speech
MGM Animation/Visual Arts short films
1960s English-language films